"Are You Ready to Fly" is a song by Zambian-born singer Rozalla from her second album, Everybody's Free (1992). The song achieved a certain success in many countries, including the United States, where it topped the Billboard Hot Dance Club Play chart. It first charted in the UK in 1992, reaching number 14. The single was also a hit across continental Europe, peaking within the top five in Belgium, Denmark and Spain. The song won an award in the category "Best Single of the Year" on the 1993 Hi-NRG Music Awards in New York.

In 1995, the song was covered by German happy hardcore band Dune with reasonable success in Germany, Switzerland and the Netherlands.

Critical reception
Larry Flick from Billboard wrote that "the furor surrounding Rozalla's No. 1 hit, "Everybody's Free", has hardly started to subside, and she launches into an equally delightful trip into the realm between rave and hi-NRG." He noted further that the song "benefits from a plethora of strong remixes that work just about every format angle imaginable. An instant club smash." Amy Linden from Entertainment Weekly described it as "incandescent". A reviewer from Music & Media commented that "the Zimbabwean singer takes off for another flight to the top. This third single in her bouncing pop/dance style completes her hat trick." 

Andy Beevers from Music Week stated that the song "is in much the same vein" as "Faith (In The Power Of Love)" and "Everybody's Free (To Feel Good)". James Hamilton from the magazine's RM Dance Update deemed it "another Yazz-style smoothly soaring and shuffling galloper". Charles Aaron from Spin stated that "the beats are really, really fast and the synths occasionally sinister, so this is technicially techno, but it's more like soul salvation raving in the wilderness." Sylvia Patterson from Smash Hits called it a "hugely merrily Italo-House piano-filled frollicker not unlike Everybody's Free except slightly less manic and even more singable."

Track listings

 7" single
 "Are You Ready to Fly" (rainbow mix) — 3:55
 "Are You Ready to Fly" (marauder a cappella edit) — 3:57

 12" maxi
 "Are You Ready to Fly" (rainbow mix) — 6:55
 "Are You Ready to Fly" (marauder a cappella mix) — 6:10
 "Are You Ready to Fly" (tekno mix) — 6:49
 "Are You Ready to Fly" (marauder mix) — 7:24

 CD single
 "Are You Ready to Fly" (rainbow mix) — 3:55
 "Are You Ready to Fly" (marauder a cappella edit) — 3:57

 CD maxi
 "Are You Ready to Fly" (rainbox mix radio edit) — 3:55
 "Are You Ready to Fly" (marauder a cappella) — 6:10
 "Are You Ready to Fly" (kaleidoscope mix) — 6:40
 "Are You Ready to Fly" (kalimba mix) — 7:05

Charts

Weekly charts

Year-end charts

Appearance in other media
The song was used in the TV commercial of the NBA in 1993, featuring Michael Jordan, Harold Miner, Shawn Kemp, Clyde Drexler and others.

Cover versions
The song was covered by German happy hardcore band Dune in 1995 with reasonable success in Germany, Switzerland and the Netherlands.

American songwriter, record producer and remixer Jason Nevins remixed the song for his 2003 album.

References

1992 singles
1992 songs
Pulse 8 singles
Rozalla songs
Songs written by Nigel Swanston